Florianópolis Dream is a 2018 Argentine comedy film directed by Ana Katz. It was screened in the Contemporary World Cinema section at the 2018 Toronto International Film Festival.

Cast
 Gustavo Garzón as Pedro
 Mercedes Morán as Lucrecia
 Andréa Beltrão as Larisa
 Marco Ricca as Marco

References

External links
 

2018 films
2018 comedy films
Argentine comedy films
2010s Spanish-language films
Films directed by Ana Katz
2010s Argentine films